"Tortrix" cratista is a species of moth of the family Tortricidae. It is found in Guatemala.

The wingspan is about 17 mm for males and 20 mm for females. The forewings are tawny with an ill-defined dark tawny-brown fascia. The central area of the hindwings is white and the margins are shaded with brownish fuscous.

References

Moths described in 1914
Archipini